Maketoquit was the leader of a large band of Potawatami in modern Clinton County, Michigan and Shiawassee County, Michigan in the late 18th and early 19th centuries.

See also 

Joseph Bailly
Alexis Bailly

Potawatomi people
People from Clinton County, Michigan
People from Shiawassee County, Michigan